The Central Development Region (Nepali: मध्यमाञ्चल विकास क्षेत्र, Madhyamānchal Bikās Kshetra) was one of Nepal's five development regions.  It was located in the east-central part of the country consisting of the capital city Kathmandu, along with its headquarters at Hetauda.

Before the adoption of provinces in 2015, it comprised three zones:
 Bagmati
 Narayani
 Janakpur

References

Development Region
Development Region
Bagmati Province

Former subdivisions of Nepal
2015 disestablishments in Nepal